Menglait Football Club is a football (soccer) club from Brunei that played in the Brunei Super League. They were founded in 1982.

Current squad

References

Association football clubs established in 1982
1982 establishments in Brunei
Football clubs in Brunei